Wendy Jie Huang, better known as Wengie or WRAYA, (born 9 January 1986) is a Chinese Australian YouTuber, vlogger, pop singer, and voice actress.

Career

YouTube 
In 2013, Huang started the YouTube channel, "Wengie", inspired by her Chinese name, Wenjie. Her videos focused on beauty, fashion, and "Do It Yourself" (DIY) tips. As of 2016, she was one of the fastest-growing stars on YouTube, having garnered over 4 million subscribers in three years. Throughout 2018, she focused on DIY videos, prank videos, and slime videos. She has earned over 1.8 billion views over her YouTube career. Her YouTube channel was awarded "Best Channel" and "Overall Winner" at the 2017 Australian Online Video Awards.

In 2013, Wengie created a second YouTube channel called "WengieVlogs". As of November 2017, WengieVlogs has 1.7 million subscribers and 53 million views. In October 2018, she changed the channel's name to "Wendie ft. Wengie". She then changed the name to "Wengie’s Life" about a year later.

In 2018, she was the most popular YouTuber from Australia with 11.5 million subscribers. Her channel was the 6th most subscribed "how-to and style" channel on YouTube in January 2018. As of 2022, her YouTube channel has 13.7 million subscribers.

Music

Wengie 
Wengie released her first single, "Baby Believe Me", in China on 13 July 2017. It debuted at number 11 and peaked at number 6 on the Chinese music charts.

She released another song on YouTube under the channel "Wengie Music Asia" on 25 November 2017, entitled "Oh I Do". As of 29 November 2017, the music video had over 9,100,000 views.

On 10 July 2018, she released the song "Cake". This was her first English single and was released on her YouTube Channel "Wengie Music". The song has over 12 million views.

On 4 May 2019, Wengie released her first Filipino-language single "Mr. Nice Guy", which featured Filipino singer Iñigo Pascual.

She also released her first Korean-language single, "Empire", on 18 October. The song features Thai singer Minnie from K-pop girl group (G)I-dle.

On 1 May 2020, she sang on a remix of the song Learn to Meow by XiaoPanPan and XiaoFengFeng.

On 9 December 2022, Wengie released the single "This Christmas".

WRAYA 
On 24 June 2021, WRAYA released her debut single "Bitter", which has over 769k views as of December 2022.

On 7 August 2021, WRAYA released her second single "Trust Issues", which has over 778k views as of December 2022.

On 2 September 2021, WRAYA released her third single "Tight Rope", which has over 1 million views as of December 2022.

On 30 September 2021, WRAYA released her fourth single "Ghost", which has over 783K views as of December 2022.

On 11 November 2021, WRAYA released her fifth single "11:11", which has over 1.4 million views as of December 2022.

On 22 February 2022, WRAYA reclaimed her identity as Wengie.

Voice acting 
In 2017, Wengie was the voice of Blisstina "Bliss" Utonium in the Australian and New Zealand versions of The Powerpuff Girls: Power of Four, a five-part TV movie.

Personal life 
Wengie moved to Australia with her grandparents as a child. She is currently based in Sydney, Australia, Los Angeles, California and China.

Discography

Extended plays

References 

1986 births
Living people
Australian voice actresses
Australian YouTubers
Beauty and makeup YouTubers
Chinese emigrants to Australia
Australian actresses of Asian descent